Curauer Au (also called Curau) is a river of Schleswig-Holstein, Germany. It flows into the Schwartau in Rohlsdorf (a district of Ratekau).

See also
List of rivers of Schleswig-Holstein

Rivers of Schleswig-Holstein
Rivers of Germany